Andriëtte Bekker (born 1958) is a South African mathematical statistician. She is a professor at the University of Pretoria, and head of the statistics department at the university.

Education
Bekker earned her Ph.D. in 1990 at the University of South Africa. Her dissertation, Veralgemening, samestelling en karakterisering as metodes om parameterryke verdelings te vind [Generalising, compounding, and characterising as methods to obtain parameter-rich distributions], was supervised by J. J. J. Roux.

Recognition
Bekker is an Elected Member of the International Statistical Institute.

References

External links

1958 births
Living people
South African statisticians
Women statisticians
University of South Africa alumni
Academic staff of the University of Pretoria
Elected Members of the International Statistical Institute